Thoykavu is a small seaside town/village in the outskirts of Thrissur, Kerala, India.

References

Villages in Thrissur district